Lauren Parker (born 15 December 1988) is an Australian paratriathlete. She won a silver medal at the 2020 Summer Paralympics.

Personal life
Parker was born on 15 December 1988 in Belmont, New South Wales. She lives in Newcastle, New South Wales. In 2022, Parker launched a scathing attack on Triathlon Australia staff claiming they were responsible for her not winning the gold medal at the Tokyo Paralympics. Triathlon Australia have denied this stating "Ms Parker has received maximum financial and personal support and approved of the race day processes for her race in Tokyo".

Paratriathlon
Before having to transition to paratriathlon as a result of a serious training accident in April 2017, Parker was a successful triathlete. She took up triathlon at the age of 18 after being a successful junior swimmer. At the 2015 Ironman World Championship in Kona she finished second in the Women's 25–29 Age Group.

The training accident left Parker with a punctured lung, broken ribs, shoulder blade and pelvis, and damaged spinal cord. She spent six months in hospital and spinal rehabilitation unit. She turned to paratriathlon and competes in the PTWC-class for wheelchair athletes. After three months training, she won the bronze medal at the 2018 Commonwealth Games, Gold Coast, Queensland.

At the 2020 Summer Paralympics Parker fished second and won the Silver medal with a time of 1:06.26. She was just 0.01 of a second behind the Gold medal winner Kendall Gretsch of the United States.

Major PTWC-class international paratriathlon results:
2018 – OTU Paratriathlon Oceania Championship, St Kilda Melbourne – 2nd place
2018 – ITU Paratriathlon World Cup, Devonport – 2nd place
2018 – Commonwealth Games, Gold Coast – Bronze medal
2018 – ITU World Paratriathlon Series Yokohama – 2nd place
2018 – ITU Paratriathlon World Cup, Besancon – 1st place
2018 – ITU World Paratriathlon Series, Iseo Franciacorta – 1st place
2018 – ITU World Triathlon Grand Final, Gold Coast – Bronze medal
2019 – ITU World Triathlon Grand Final, Lausanne – Gold medal
2020 – Summer Paralympic Games, Tokyo – Silver medal -Women's PTWC
2021 – ITU World Triathlon Championship Series, Abu Dhabi – Gold medal – Women's PTWC
2022 – ITU World Triathlon Championship Series, Abu Dhabi – Gold medal – Women's PTWC

Parker is coached by Dan Atkins.

Recognition
2018 – New South Wales Institute of Sport Ian Thorpe OAM Outstanding Achievement Award for having come back from a horrific training accident the previous year to qualify, compete and win bronze at the Gold Coast 2018 Commonwealth Games.
2018 – Sport NSW Athlete of the Year with a Disability
2018 – Triathlon Australia Chris Hewitt Emerging Athlete Award.
2019 – Australian Women's Health Sport Awards Comeback of the Year.
2019 – New South Wales Institute of Sport Ian Thorpe OAM Outstanding Achievement Award recognised Parker's ongoing battle to overcome her tragic training accident in 2017, with the paratriathlete ending the 2019 season as a world champion.
2019 – Sport NSW Athlete of the Year with a Disability.
2021 - Triathlon Australia Performance of the Year
2021 - Triathlon Australia Para-triathlon Female Performance of the Year
2021 - Triathlon Australia Athlete's Athlete of the Year  
2022 - Sport NSW Athlete of the Year with a Disability.
2022 - Triathlon Australia Performance of the Year
2022 - Triathlon Australia Para-triathlon Female Performance of the Year

References

External links

Lauren Parker Foundation
International Triathlon Union Profile and Results

1988 births
Commonwealth Games medallists in triathlon
Commonwealth Games bronze medallists for Australia
Living people
Paralympic athletes of Australia
Paratriathletes at the 2020 Summer Paralympics
Paratriathletes of Australia
Triathletes at the 2018 Commonwealth Games
Medalists at the 2020 Summer Paralympics
Paralympic silver medalists for Australia
Medallists at the 2018 Commonwealth Games